Hinduism is a minority religion in Sweden practised by 0.6% of the population or 65.000 people out of a population of 10.5 million. Hinduism is practised mainly by persons of Indian origin and non-resident Indians together. A majority of them are Tamils, Punjabis, Bengalis, Gujaratis, Telugu's and Kannadigas.

History
Some Indian students who went to Sweden in the 1950s settled down there. Another stream of Indians came from Uganda in the 1970s. Some Indians sought and obtained political asylum after 1984. The Indian community is culturally very active. Different associations hold cultural functions and observe national days.

There were also Tamil Hindu refugees from Sri Lanka and Hindu refugees from Bangladesh. After Sweden’s immigration policy reform in 2008, India has become a leading country of labor supply, mostly of computer specialists.

Demographics

In 2005, there were between 7,000 to 10,000 Hindus. Of the 10,000 Hindus, 2,000 were of Tamil origin and 1,500 were of Bengali origin.

Hinduism is growing rapidly in Sweden due to labour migration of Indian IT and other engineers. According to official Swedish government statistics, the number of inhabitants born in India was approximately 48000 persons in 2021. If one adds second generation and Indians who have been naturalised ie taken Swedish citizenship, the total number of Indian origin persons should be around 70.000 persons. Of these, approximately 80% or 56.000 persons could be assumed to be Hindu, which if added with Hindus from other countries such as Nepal, Sri Lanka, Bangladesh and others would take the total to around 65-70.000 Hindus in Sweden in 2022.

Hindu Organisations in Sweden
Hindu Forum Sweden (HFS) is the major Hindu association in Sweden. HFS is an umbrella organization of Hindu Forum Europe (HFE). In 2018, this organization also celebrates Hindu festival Diwali with Hindus of Sweden, Swedish politicians and representatives of inter-religious groups.
Other associations:
Bengali Hindu Association
Hindu Mandir Stockholm (Stockholm Hindu Temple) 
Hindu Union Jönköping
Stockholm Kannada Koota
The International Swaminarayan Satsang Organisation has a temple in Mariestad

International Society for Krishna Consciousness in Sweden
International Society for Krishna Consciousness, the Krishna movement or Hare Krishna has its roots in the Hindu religion.

The Krishna movement in Sweden functions from few places in Sweden. 

 Korsnäs Gård, in Botkyrka municipal in the Stockholm county , is an establishment on the countryside with a Hare Krishna temple. Korsnäs has as its main function to work with the publishing company BBT (Bhaktivedanta Book Trust) who translates the Hare Krishna books to various languages for the entire world. The original books in English was translated by Srila Prabhupada who started the movement. Srila Prabhupada visited Sweden in 1973. 
 The Hare Krishna center in Stockholm runs a restaurant, a shop and a small temple. 
 The Almviks gård in the south of Stockholm County is also a country side establishment with a temple. Originally this was an agricultural cooperative but has later changed into a village project combining agriculture with families living there but working elsewhere.

See also
Hinduism in France
Hinduism in Spain

Notes

External links
Ministry of Overseas Indian Affairs: Sweden
Hindu organisations in Sweden

Hinduism by country
Hinduism in Europe
Religion in Sweden